Kruglovka is a rural locality (a khutor) and the administrative center of Kruglovskoye Rural Settlement, Nekhayevsky District, Volgograd Oblast, Russia. The population was 938 as of 2010. There are 14 streets.

Geography 
Kruglovka is located on the Peskovatka River, 37 km southwest of Nekhayevskaya (the district's administrative centre) by road. Makhiny is the nearest rural locality.

References 

Rural localities in Nekhayevsky District